Antalya Festival is an annual festival that takes place for 18 days between 12 and 29 September in Antalya, Turkey, celebrating the city's culture.

References 

Festivals in Antalya
Annual events in Turkey
Autumn events in Turkey